Rachel Gordon (born 10 May 1976) is an Australian actress.

Early life 
Gordon was born in Brisbane, Australia, the daughter of Donna Gordon. Her great-grandfather was Prime Minister Joseph Lyons, and her great-grandmother was Dame Enid Lyons, who was the first woman in the Australian parliament. 
Gordon is a 1997 graduate of the National Institute of Dramatic Art (NIDA) in  Sydney. Since her graduation, she has combined stage acting with various roles in Australian television and films.

Roles 
Gordon played Detective Senior Constable Amy Fox in the long-running television show Blue Heelers, from 2004 to 2006. She appeared in long-running soap opera Neighbours in 2007, playing Charlotte Stone. She followed this with Home and Away, playing the estranged mother of Drew Curtis. In 2016, Gordon began appearing in the Seven Network drama The Secret Daughter.

Personal life
In late 2004, Gordon married her partner of 11 years, actor Scott Johnson, who she met at NIDA. They divorced in 2009.

Filmography

Film

Television

References

External links

1976 births
Australian film actresses
Australian television actresses
Living people
People from Brisbane
National Institute of Dramatic Art alumni